The 2017–18 AHL season was the 82nd season of the American Hockey League. The regular season ran from October 6, 2017, to April 15, 2018. The 2018 Calder Cup playoffs followed the conclusion of the regular season. The Toronto Marlies won their first Calder Cup in seven games over the Texas Stars.

League changes

The AHL's only alignment change was moving the Charlotte Checkers from the Central Division of the Western Conference to the Atlantic Division of the Eastern Conference, significantly decreasing their interdivisional travel and balancing the two conferences' members. Similar to the season scheduling in the previous season, the six California and Arizona based teams continued to have a 68-game season while the rest of the AHL teams play a 76-game season.

Team and NHL affiliation changes
The National Hockey League added the Vegas Golden Knights for the 2017–18 season. The Las Vegas management confirmed that the organization would also have an AHL affiliate in their first season, although it was not stated whether the AHL team would be an expansion or relocation. The organization looked into adding an affiliate on the West Coast with the leading candidates being Salt Lake City, Reno, or Fresno. However, as the season went on, they looked into co-affiliations with a pre-existing AHL team since the new NHL team would likely not have a large amount of drafted talent to fully stock an AHL roster. In February 2017, AHL commissioner David Andrews later stated that there was a "50-50 chance" of a 31st team being established for the 2017–18 season.

Other than the Golden Knights adding a team, there were also reports in November 2016 of the St. Louis Blues adding an expansion team in Kansas City. This would later be denied by the announced potential owner in Kansas City, Lamar Hunt Jr., in a press release from his ECHL team in the area, the Missouri Mavericks, and further denied by AHL commissioner, David Andrews, after the January 2017 Board of Governors meeting. In May 2017, the 30 team alignment was confirmed and there would be no expansion for 2017–18. The Golden Knights signed a multi-year affiliation with the Chicago Wolves, replacing the Blues as their primary affiliate. The Blues also announced that they would continue to send players to the Wolves for that season, as well as to the San Antonio Rampage, the AHL team that they would affiliate with for 2018–19.

The league confirmed after the 2017 Board of Governors meeting that it had made a commitment to an expansion applicant for a 31st team for the 2018–19 season later revealed to be the Colorado Eagles. The Eagles had been a member of the ECHL prior to the promotion and the affiliate of the Colorado Avalanche. The Eagles join other recent ECHL markets in the AHL such as Bakersfield, Charlotte, Ontario, and Stockton.

Relocations
The Albany Devils relocated to become the Binghamton Devils to replace the Binghamton Senators.
The Binghamton Senators were purchased by their parent club, the Ottawa Senators, and relocated to Belleville, Ontario, as the Belleville Senators.
The Montreal Canadiens' AHL franchise, then operating as the St. John's IceCaps, was relocated to the Montreal suburb of Laval, Quebec, as the Laval Rocket. Danny Williams, owner of the IceCaps team but not a franchise holder, announced on the same day his intentions to find another AHL franchise to replace the Canadiens' owned franchise. A separate ownership group bought an ECHL expansion team called the Newfoundland Growlers a season later.

Affiliation changes

Standings 
Final standings:

 indicates team has clinched division and a playoff spot
 indicates team has clinched a playoff spot
 indicates team has been eliminated from playoff contention

Eastern Conference

Western Conference

Statistical leaders

Leading skaters 
The following players are sorted by points, then goals. Updated as of April 15, 2018.

GP = Games played; G = Goals; A = Assists; Pts = Points; +/– = Plus-minus; PIM = Penalty minutes

Leading goaltenders 
The following goaltenders with a minimum 1440 minutes played lead the league in goals against average. Updated as of April 15, 2018.

GP = Games played; TOI = Time on ice (in minutes); SA = Shots against; GA = Goals against; SO = Shutouts; GAA = Goals against average; SV% = Save percentage; W = Wins; L = Losses; OT = Overtime/shootout loss

Calder Cup playoffs

Playoff format
The 2018 Calder Cup playoffs format was retained from the divisional format of the 2017 Calder Cup playoffs. The playoff format was finalized at the Annual Board of Governors meeting that took place July 2017. During the regular season, teams receive two points for a win and one point for an overtime or shootout loss. The top four teams in each division ranked by points percentage (points earned divided by points available) qualify for the 2017 Calder Cup playoffs.

The 2018 Calder Cup playoffs features a divisional playoff format, leading to conference finals and ultimately the Calder Cup finals. The division semifinals are best-of-five series; all subsequent rounds are best-of-seven.

Bracket

AHL awards

All-Star Teams
First All-Star Team
Garret Sparks (G) – Toronto
Jacob MacDonald (D) – Binghamton
Sami Niku (D) – Manitoba
Mason Appleton (F) – Manitoba
Chris Terry (F) – Laval
Phil Varone (F) – Lehigh Valley

Second All-Star Team
Michael Hutchinson (G) – Manitoba
T. J. Brennan (D) – Lehigh Valley
Zach Redmond (D) – Rochester
Austin Czarnik (F) – Providence
Andreas Johnsson (F) – Toronto
Ben Smith (F) – Toronto

All-Rookie Team
Ville Husso (G) – San Antonio
Filip Hronek (D) – Grand Rapids
Sami Niku (D) – Manitoba
Mason Appleton (F) – Manitoba
Daniel Sprong (F) – Wilkes-Barre/Scranton
Dylan Strome (F) – Tucson

See also
List of AHL seasons
2017 in ice hockey
2018 in ice hockey

References

External links
AHL official site

 
American Hockey League seasons
2017–18 in American ice hockey by league
2017–18 in Canadian ice hockey by league